Rut Arnfjörð Jónsdóttir (born 21 July 1990 in Reykjavík) is an Icelandic handballer who plays for KA/Þór as a right back. She was member of the Icelandic team that participated on the 2010 European Championship, the first ever European international tournament the country qualified for.

Achievements
EHF Cup:
Finalist: 2011

References

External links
 Profile on Team Tvis Holstebro official website

1990 births
Living people
Rut Arnfjord Jonsdottir
Rut Arnfjord Jonsdottir
Rut Arnfjord Jonsdottir
Rut Arnfjord Jonsdottir
21st-century Icelandic women